Death in a French Garden  is a 1985 French drama film directed by Michel Deville. It was entered into the 35th Berlin International Film Festival.

Plot
David Aurphet, a struggling guitar teacher, is invited to give lessons to Viviane Tombsthay, the daughter of a well-to-do couple. The wife, Julia, commences an affair with him while Viviane and a neighbour, Edwige, proposition him. Later, David is robbed but is rescued by a stranger, Daniel Forest, whom he has seen hanging around near the Tombsthay's property. Daniel admits to being a contract killer who is on a job and suggests that the robbery is a cover for someone who wishes to injure David's hand, such as a jealous husband.

David receives an anonymous video tape with evidence of his affair; Julia says she has received one, too. He tells Edwige about the video but not about Julia. After he finds that someone has been at his house, he asks Daniel to stay overnight just in case. Julia appears and invites David to her home as her husband is away. After she leaves, Daniel tells David that Julia's husband, Graham, is his intended target. He warns David to be wary of Graham and suggest he avoids Julia for a while. When David refuses, Daniel gives him a hand gun for protection.

David arrives but finds Graham there wanting to kill him. David shoots him. Julia advises David to leave and he seeks refuge with Edwige. She shows him a video that shows that he only injured Graham, who was later killed by Julia. 

David is later threatened by Daniel over some missing microfilm. David kills him and leaves the area with Viviane.

Cast
 Anémone as Edwige Ledieu
 Richard Bohringer as Daniel Forest
 Nicole Garcia as Julia Tombsthay
 Christophe Malavoy as David Aurphet
 Michel Piccoli as Graham Tombsthay
 Anaïs Jeanneret as Vivianne Tombsthay
 Jean-Claude Jay as Father
 Hélène Roussel as Mother
 Franck de la Personne as Guitar dealer
 Élisabeth Vitali as Waitress
 Daniel Vérité as Attacker

References

External links

1985 films
1985 drama films
1980s French-language films
French drama films
Films directed by Michel Deville
Adultery in films
Gaumont Film Company films
Films whose director won the Best Director César Award
1980s French films